Narayan Deka is a Bharatiya Janata Party politician from Assam. He was elected as a Member of Legislative Assembly from Barkhetry constituency in 2016. He defeated Diganta Barman (Indian National Congress), with a margin of approximately 9000 votes. However he lost to Diganta in 2021.

Narayan Deka is the founder and chairman of International School Guwahati.

He is currently appointed the chairman of GMDA (Guwahati Metropolitan Development Authority).

References 

Living people
Bharatiya Janata Party politicians from Assam
Assam MLAs 2016–2021
People from Kamrup Metropolitan district
Year of birth missing (living people)